The 1977 season was the 65th season of competitive soccer in the United States.

National teams

Men

Senior

Women

Managerial changes

League standings

North American Soccer League (Div. 1) 

Atlantic Conference
Northern Division

Eastern DivisionPacific Conference
Western Division

Southern Division

Playoffs

American Soccer League (Div. 2)

College soccer

National Challenge Cup

Final

American clubs in international competition

References 
 The Year in American Soccer - 1977

 
Seasons in American soccer